Association Sportive et Culturelle Nasr de Sebkha known as ASC Nasr de Sebkha is a Mauritanian football club based in Sebkha, founded in 1997.

Achievements
 Mauritanean Premier League
Champion (3): 2003, 2005, 2007

 Coupe du Président de la République
Winner (1): 2006

Mauritanian Super Cup
Winner (1): 2003

Performance in CAF competitions
 CAF Champions League: 1 appearance
2004 – First Round

 CAF Cup Winners' Cup: 1 appearance
2003 – First Round

References
World Football Archive (in German)

External links
Team profile – maurifoot.net

Football clubs in Mauritania
Association football clubs established in 1997
1997 establishments in Mauritania